Getting Gertie's Garter is a 1927 American silent comedy film directed by E. Mason Hopper and starring Marie Prevost, Charles Ray and Sally Rand. It is an adaptation of the 1921 play of the same name by Wilson Collison and Avery Hopwood.

Cast
 Marie Prevost as Gertie Darling 
 Charles Ray as Ken Walrick 
 Harry Myers as Jimmy Felton 
 Sally Rand as Teddy Desmond 
 William Orlamond as Jenkins 
 Fritzi Ridgeway as Barbara Felton 
 Franklin Pangborn as Algy Brooks 
 Dell Henderson as Barry Scott 
 Lila Leslie as Teddy's Aunt

Preservation status
The film is preserved at UCLA Film & Television Archive.

References

Bibliography
 Munden, Kenneth White. The American Film Institute Catalog of Motion Pictures Produced in the United States, Part 1. University of California Press, 1997.

External links
 
 

1927 films
1927 comedy films
1920s English-language films
American silent feature films
Silent American comedy films
Films directed by E. Mason Hopper
American black-and-white films
Producers Distributing Corporation films
1920s American films